is a Japanese football manager. He currently manager of FC Imabari.

Club career
After featuring for both Funabashi Municipal High School and the Teikyo University, Takagi opted to retire and pursue a coaching career from the upcoming year.

Managerial career
He faced a decade as a coach in three different high schools, only to end up at Kyoto Sanga in 2011: under the guide of Takeshi Oki, he worked as an assistant coach from 2011 to 2013.

The year after, he found a new job at Gainare Tottori, where he stayed two years before joining Shonan Bellmare. Nevertheless, he stayed just one year in Hiratsuka, since Gainare Tottori offered him a new job at the club, this time as the coach of the U-18 side.

After the dismissal of Daisuke Sudo by the club, Gainare offered Takagi the top team coaching spot, which he accepted for the 2019 season. His work was notable, since he won the "Manager of the Month" Award twice in his rookie season (in July and October 2019).

He was dismissed from the head coach of Gainare Tottori on May 4, 2021 

On 27 November 2022, Takagi appointed of manager J3 club, FC Imabari from 2023 replace Kazuaki Hashikawa left the club after end of 2022 season.

Managerial statistics

.

References

External links
J. League Profile
Riki Takagi's profile in the Gainare Tottori's website

1978 births
Living people
Teikyo University alumni
Association football people from Chiba Prefecture
Japanese football managers
J3 League managers
Gainare Tottori managers
FC Imabari managers